Nylon Beat is a Finnish girl group consisting of Jonna Kosonen and Erin Koivisto (later known as Erin during her solo career). Their main period of popularity was during the late 1990s and early 2000s.

History
The band was formed in 1995 as a result of the TV show "Kiitorata" ('runway' in English). At that time, both girls were only 18 years old. They started with backup tracks and dancers. Later their music matured somewhat and finally they performed fully live with a band of professional musicians. Most of the music was written by Risto Asikainen and Ilkka Vainio and produced by Asikainen.

The duo received eight gold and seven platinum records and the Band of the Year 1999 Emma award during their active career (1995–2003).

Other artists have covered Nylon Beat songs, most notably popular South Korean k-pop girl groups S.E.S. and Aespa, whose 1998 and 2021 version respectively called "Dreams Come True" retains an almost intact beat and melody of the original "" ("Like a Fool") song from 1996.

Although the duo nominally had already given their final concert on New Year's Eve 2003, they reformed again to perform as an opening act during two Toto gigs. The first tune on August 17, 2007 in Oulu, and the second on August 18, 2007 in Tampere.

Discography

Albums

Compilation albums

Live albums

Singles
Charting singles

Other non-charting singles
1995: "Oot kuin karkkia mulle" 
1996: "Teflon love"
1996: "Lä-lä-lä"
1997: "Satasen laina"
1997: "Kuumalle hiekalle"
1997: "Jos"
1998: "Like a fool"
1998: "Umm ma ma"
1999: "Ainut jonka sain"
2000: "Syntinen"
2001: "Guilty"
2002: "Sanoja"
2002: "Moka"
2002: "Last in Line" / "Eternal Love"
2003: "Petollinen päiväkirja"
2003: "Nukutaan"
2003: "Kevytlinja" / "Psykedeliaa"
2004: "Kuumalle Hiekalle" (Remix)
2004: "Teflon Love" (Live)
2007: "Seksi vie 12 apinaa kuumalle hiekalle"

Featured in

See also
 List of best-selling music artists in Finland

References

External links
  
  

Finnish musical duos
Finnish girl groups
Musical groups established in 1995
Musical groups disestablished in 2003
English-language singers from Finland
Female musical duos